Guerra dos Sexos is a 1983 Brazilian telenovela created by Silvio de Abreu, starring Fernanda Montenegro and Paulo Autran in the main roles.

A remake was produced and aired by TV Globo in 2012, starring Irene Ravache and Tony Ramos.

Plot 
Charlô (Fernanda Montenegro) and Otávio (Paulo Autran) are cousins, and they inherit an inheritance of their uncle Enrico, that includes a chain of stores and the mansion where they live. Charlô makes a proposal to Otavio: one of them must give up his part in a bet.

Cast

References

External links
Guerra dos Sexos  at Memória Globo

TV Globo telenovelas
1983 telenovelas
Brazilian telenovelas
1983 Brazilian television series debuts
1984 Brazilian television series endings
Portuguese-language telenovelas
Television series set in shops